Sulphur, Texas may refer to the following places in Texas:
Sulphur, Bowie County, Texas
Sulphur, Trinity County, Texas